Aaron Kemps (born 10 September 1983 in Bundaberg, Queensland) is an Australian racing cyclist.

Major results

2001
 3rd  U-19 Points Race World Championship
2003
 1st Stage 6 Giro delle Regione U-23
 1st Stage 1 Baby Giro
2004
 1st Coppa Citta' di Asti U-23
2005
 3rd Stage 6 Paris–Nice
2006
 1st Stage 1 Vuelta Ciclista a Burgos
2007
 1st Herald Sun Classic  
 1st Stage 3 Herald Sun Tour 
 1st Stage 7 Herald Sun Tour 
 1st Noosa International Criterium
 15th Gent–Wevelgem
2008
 2nd Stage 4 Tour de Georgia
2009
 2nd Stage 2 Vuelta Ciclista a la Comunidad de Madrid
 4th Noosa International Criterium
 8th Overall Herald Sun Tour
2010
 1st  National Criterium Champion
2011
 1st Stage 1 Tour of Qinghai Lake

References

External links 

 
 

Australian male cyclists
1983 births
Living people
Sportspeople from Bundaberg
Cyclists at the 2006 Commonwealth Games
Cyclists from Queensland
Commonwealth Games competitors for Australia